Walker Spur is a notable rock spur forming the east side of Compton Valley in the north part of the Ford Massif, Thiel Mountains. The name was proposed by Peter Bermel and Arthur Ford, co-leaders of the United States Geological Survey (USGS) Thiel Mountains party which surveyed these mountains in 1960–61. Named for Captain Joseph G. Walker, United States Marine Corps (USMC), Squadron VX-6 pilot who made several flights in support of the USGS party in 1960–61.

Ridges of Ellsworth Land